A county is a geographic region within Gaelic games, controlled by a county board of the Gaelic Athletic Association (GAA) and originally based on the 32 counties of Ireland as they were in 1884. While the administrative geography of Ireland has since changed, with several new counties created and the six that make up Northern Ireland superseded by 11 local government districts, the counties in Gaelic games have remained largely unchanged.

However, the county as used in Gaelic games does not always and everywhere cover precisely the same territory as the traditional county. Particularly in the first 50 years of the Association but also in more recent times, there are many examples of clubs based in one of the administrative counties being allowed to participate in the leagues or championships of a neighbouring county. There are also instances where the official county boundary does not coincide precisely with the county as used in Gaelic games, for example where a club is based on a parish that crosses the county border. While in most cases the name of the county as used in Gaelic games is the same as that of the current or former administrative county, there have been exceptions: Derry has never used the official county name of Londonderry, and the board of the county then officially known as Queen's County changed its name in 1907 to Leix and Ossary, later becoming Laois. Each county board is responsible for organising GAA club fixtures within the county, and for the promotion and development of Gaelic games and the other objectives of the Association.

The county can also refer to the inter-county teams fielded by each county board. While in general any county, and only a county, is eligible to compete in the provincial and national championships and leagues, and almost all do so, again there can be anomalies: in the National Hurling League, for example, a team representing Fingal — a sub-region of the GAA county of Dublin, corresponding to the modern administrative county of Fingal — previously competed against other counties.

Since the inception of the county system, there have been changes to the respective regions of control of the overseas units. In Ireland the concept of the county is very strong and changing the county boundary is extremely controversial. In 2002 a proposal to divide Dublin in two was quickly and strongly opposed.

County boards
Listed below are the 32 county boards based in Ireland and the province (and, hence, the provincial council) to which each is affiliated. Also provided is a map showing the location of the province, i.e. north, south, east, west.

County teams

Listed below are all the national and overseas county teams (as of 2022).

Overseas county boards 
Counties as used in Gaelic games outside Ireland cover large geographic non-traditional areas which are not considered as counties in any other context. For example, Scotland is a county for GAA purposes, as is London, while the remaining counties of Great Britain cover wider areas than their names suggest. The Hertfordshire County Board, for example, oversees clubs in Hertfordshire, Bedfordshire, Cambridgeshire and Oxfordshire; Gloucestershire GAA reaches into South Wales, Warwickshire GAA includes Staffordshire and Birmingham, and so on. There are also "county boards" for Australasia, Canada, New York, the rest of North America, Europe and Asia, while other overseas GAA regions such as the Cayman Islands operate with their own structures not including county boards.

London enters a county team in the National Football League and the All-Ireland Senior Football Championship, while it also enters another county team in the National Hurling League and the All-Ireland Senior Hurling Championship. London's county football team reached the 2013 Connacht Senior Football Championship final.

New York enters a county team in the All-Ireland Senior Football Championship.

Warwickshire enters a county team in the National Hurling League and All-Ireland Senior Hurling Championship, while Lancashire enters a county team in both.

Scotland does not currently enter a team, nor do Gloucestershire, Hertfordshire or Yorkshire.

As of 2023, no team from continental Europe, Canada, the rest of the United States, Asia or Australasia competes against the counties of Ireland in any of the Gaelic games.

Overseas county boards

See also
 County colours (Gaelic games)
 List of GAA county nicknames

Notes

References

Gaelic games
County
County